Pandit Vihara is a Buddhist vihara of ancient Bengal called Chaityabhumi now known as Chittagong in Bangladesh.

The remains
Numerous sculptures, murals, copper plates, inscriptions, seals, coins, plaques, potteries and works in stone, bronze, stucco and terracotta have been unearthed within the ruins of Pandit Vihara. The artefacts are now preserved in various museums of Bangladesh.

Revival efforts
On 28 March 2010, Prime Minister of Bangladesh Sheikh Hasina proposed the idea, while addressing the Joint Session during her visit to China, for revival of Pandit university. The name of the university will be changed to International Pandit University and restored following the footsteps of the revival of the ancient Nalanda University in India.

References

Buildings and structures completed in the 9th century
Buddhist monasteries in Bangladesh
Ancient universities of the Indian subcontinent
Archaeological sites in Bangladesh
Former populated places in Bangladesh
Pala Empire
Buddhist sites in Bangladesh